Edin Nuredinoski (born 21 April 1982) is a Macedonian football goalkeeper who last played for Aris Limassol in the Cypriot First Division.

Club career
He spent half a season at 2.Bundesliga side Eintracht Braunschweig, but did not play a league game.
In July 2012 Nuredinoski signed a two year contract with Azerbaijan Premier League side FC Baku. Nuredinoski left Baku in early May 2014 due to unpaid wages.

Statistics

International career
Nuredinoski made his debut for Macedonia on 11 October 2009 in a 2-1 friendly win over Qatar and has earned a total of 14 caps, scoring no goals. His final international was a May 2012 friendly against Angola.

Honours and awards
FK Vardar Skopje
First Macedonian Football League Runner-up: 2000-01

FK Sloga Jugomagnat
Macedonian Cup: 2003-04

FK Milano Kumanovo
First Macedonian Football League: 2008-09

References

External links
Profile at MacedonianFootball.com 

1982 births
Living people
Footballers from Skopje
Association football goalkeepers
Macedonian footballers
North Macedonia international footballers
FK Vardar players
FK Sloga Jugomagnat players
FK Pobeda players
Eintracht Braunschweig players
FK Cementarnica 55 players
FK Milano Kumanovo players
Ethnikos Achna FC players
FC Baku players
Aris Limassol FC players
Ermis Aradippou FC players
Macedonian First Football League players
Azerbaijan Premier League players
Cypriot First Division players
Cypriot Second Division players
Macedonian expatriate footballers
Expatriate footballers in Germany
Macedonian expatriate sportspeople in Germany
Expatriate footballers in Cyprus
Macedonian expatriate sportspeople in Cyprus
Expatriate footballers in Azerbaijan
Macedonian expatriate sportspeople in Azerbaijan